1852 Naval Air Squadron (1852 NAS) was a Naval Air Squadron of the Royal Navy's Fleet Air Arm.

References

Citations

Bibliography

External links
 

1800 series Fleet Air Arm squadrons
Military units and formations established in 1945